Horumonyaki is a kind of Japanese cuisine made from beef or pork offal. Kitazato Shigeo, the chef of a yōshoku restaurant (one that specializes in Western-derived cuisine) in Osaka devised this dish and registered a trademark in 1940. It was originally derived from Yakiniku. The name horumon is derived from the word "hormone", with the intended meaning of "stimulation", as in the original Greek. The name horumon is also similar to the Kansai dialect term hōrumon, which means "discarded goods".  Horumonyaki has a reputation for being a "stamina building" food.

Although horumon may be beef or pork, pork is more commonly used. (Note: Names vary considerably depending on the source animal and also on regional dialect.) Common horumon items include:

 gari: esophagus
 hatsu: heart*
 hatsumoto ("heart-base"): pulmonary artery*
 kobukuro: uterus
 oppai ("teat"): mammary
 sagari: diaphragm
 shibire: pancreas
 shiro ("white"): intestine
 teppō ("rifle"): rectum

 although "hearts" would typically be pronounced and written in roman script (romaji) with an elongated "a" sound written as "aa" as in haasu, it is pronounced in Japanese unelongated, hence the one "a".

References

Beef dishes
Japanese fusion cuisine
Korean fusion cuisine
Pork dishes
Offal